Craspedometopon is a genus of flies in the family Stratiomyidae.

Species
Craspedometopon frontale Kertész, 1909
Craspedometopon orientale Rozkošný & Kovac, 2007
Craspedometopon spina Yang, Wei & Yang, 2010
Craspedometopon tibetense Yang, Zhang & Li, 2014
Craspedometopon ussuricum Krivosheina, 1973

References

Stratiomyidae
Brachycera genera
Taxa named by Kálmán Kertész
Diptera of Asia